The Pan-African flag (also known as the Afro-American flag, Black Liberation flag, UNIA flag, and various other names) is a tri-color flag consisting of three equal horizontal bands of (from top down) red, black, and green. The Universal Negro Improvement Association and African Communities League (UNIA-ACL) formally adopted it on August 13, 1920, in Article 39 of the Declaration of the Rights of the Negro Peoples of the World, during its month-long convention at Madison Square Garden in New York City. Variations of the flag can and have been used in various countries and territories in the Americas to represent Garveyist ideologies.

History

The flag was created in 1920 by members of UNIA in response to the "coon song" that became a hit around 1900, titled, "Every Race Has a Flag but the Coon". This song has been cited as one of the three songs that "firmly established the term coon in the American vocabulary". In a 1927 report of a 1921 speech appearing in the Negro World weekly newspaper, Marcus Garvey was quoted as saying:

The Universal Negro Catechism, published by the UNIA in 1921, refers to the colors of the flag meaning:

Journalist Charles Mowbray White has asserted that Garvey proposed the colors red, black and green for the following reasons: "Garvey said red because of sympathy for the 'Reds of the world', and the Green their sympathy for the Irish in their fight for freedom, and the Black [for] the Negro."

According to the UNIA more recently, the three colors on the Black Nationalist flag represent:
 red: the blood that unites all people of Black African ancestry, and shed for liberation;
 black: black people whose existence as a nation, though not a nation-state, is affirmed by the existence of the flag; and
 green: the abundant natural wealth of Africa.

The flag later became a Black Nationalist symbol for the worldwide liberation of Black people. As an emblem of Black pride, the flag became popular during the Black Liberation movement of the 1960s. In 1971, the school board of Newark, New Jersey, passed a resolution permitting the flag to be raised in public school classrooms. Four of the board's nine members were not present at the time, and the resolution was introduced by the board's teen member, a mayoral appointee. Fierce controversy ensued, including a court order that the board show cause why they should not be forced to rescind the resolution, and at least two state legislative proposals to ban ethnic flags and national flags (other than the U.S. flag) in public classrooms.

In the United States, the flag is currently widely available through flag shops or ethnic specialty stores. It is commonly seen at parades commemorating Martin Luther King, Jr. Day, civil rights rallies, and other special events.

Juneteenth holiday connection
June 19, 1865, is the date in which enslaved people in Galveston, Texas finally received the news of their freedom. This is commemorated every June 19 with Juneteenth, which is considered the longest-running African American holiday. Many in the African American community have adopted the Pan-African flag to represent Juneteenth. The Juneteenth holiday became an official federal holiday June 17, 2021 and does have its own flag, however, created in 1997 - the Juneteenth flag.

2010s notable usage
In the United States, following the refusal of a grand jury to indict a police officer in the August 9, 2014 shooting of Michael Brown in Ferguson, Missouri, a Howard University student replaced the U.S. flag on that school's Washington, D.C. campus flagpole with a "black solidarity" flag (this tricolor) flying at half-mast.

2020s notable usage
In February 2023, the Pan-African flag was flown over the Denver Federal Center to commemorate Black History Month, which was the first time that flag was flown over any federal building.

Derivative flags

Flags of nation states

A number of flags of nation states in African and the Caribbean have been inspired by the UNIA flag. The Biafran flag is another variant of the UNIA flag with a sunburst in the center. Designed by the Biafran government and first raised in 1967, the colors are directly based on Garvey's design.

The flag of Malawi issued in 1964 is very similar, reflects the Black Nationalist flag's order of stripes. It is not directly based on Garvey's flag, although the colors have the same symbolism: Red for blood symbolizing the struggle of the people, green for vegetation, and black for the race of the people.

The Kenyan flag (Swahili: Bendera ya Kenya) is a tricolor of black, red, and green with two white fimbriations imposed, with a Masai shield and two crossed spears. It was officially adopted on 12 December 1963 after Kenya's independence, inspired by the pan-African tricolour.

The flag of Saint Kitts and Nevis has similar colors, arranged diagonally and separated by yellow lines. It similar to the Malawian flag in that the colors are not directly taken from the Pan-African flag but the symbolism is the same.

Derivative flags in the United States

In response to the controversy over the flying of the Confederate flag, an African American-run company called NuSouth created a flag based on the Confederate naval jack, with the white stars and saltire outline replaced by green and the blue saltire made black.

The Kwanzaa Bendera
In the 1960s The Us Organization redesigned the UNIA flag also changing order and significance of the colours to: black, red and green. Defining "black" for the people, "red" for struggle, and "green" for the future built "out of struggle".

United States Postal Service issued a stamp in 1997 to commemorate the African-American festival of Kwanzaa with a painting by artist Synthia Saint James of a dark-skinned family wearing garments traditional in parts of Africa and fashionable for special occasions among African-Americans. The family members are holding food, gifts, and a flag. The flag in the stamp may have been meant to represent the Pan-African flag but instead used the similar flag (a black, red, and green horizontal tricolour) of the Black nationalist organisation Us Organization, which shares its founder, professor and activist Maulana Karenga, with Kwanzaa.

The bendera (flag in the Kiswahili language) was documented as an supplemental symbol of Kwanzaa, in Karenga's 1998 book The African American Holiday of Kwanzaa, and included in ceremonial use during the festival.

Artworks

In 1990, artist David Hammons created a work called African-American Flag, which is held by the Museum of Modern Art in New York City. Based on the standard U.S. flag, its stripes are black and red, the canton field is green, and the stars on the canton field are black.

Alternative names
The flag goes by several other names with varying degrees of popularity:

the Afro-American flag
the Bendera Ya Taifa (Kiswahili for "flag of the Nation"), in reference to its usage during Kwanzaa
the Black Liberation flag
the International African flag
the Marcus Garvey flag
the UNIA flag, after its originators
the Universal African flag
the Red Black Green (RBG) flag
the Black Nationalist flag

Proposed holiday
In 1999, an article appeared in the July 25 edition of The Black World Today suggesting that, as an act of global solidarity, every August 17 should be celebrated worldwide as Universal African Flag Day by flying the red, black, and green banner. August 17 is the birthday of Marcus Garvey.

See also

Black Nationalism
Ethnic flag
Flag of the Romani people
Flag of the Hispanic People
Australian Aboriginal Flag
Berber flag
Flags of Africa
Juneteenth flag
LGBT pride flags
Marcus Garvey
Pan-Africanism
Pan-African colours: Red, gold and green (Ethiopian)
Pan-Arab colours: Black, white, green and red
Flag of South Sudan
Flag of Kenya
Flag of Saint Kitts and Nevis
Flag of Malawi
Black American Heritage Flag

Notes

References
"Black Flag", unattributed article in Time magazine, December 13, 1971.

External links
Afro-American flags at Flags of the World
Sheet music from the American Memory website of the Library of Congress
'Fly the Red, Black, and Green' article proposing holiday at The Black World Today, July 25, 1999
Kwanzaa Stamp U.S. postage depicting similar flag, with explanatory press release
UNIA official website

Ethnic flags
Flags of international organizations
African and Black nationalism
Pan-Africanism
Flags introduced in 1920
Universal Negro Improvement Association and African Communities League